Marika Trettin (born 12 August 1983 in Altenberg, Saxony) is a German female curler.

Teams

Women's

Mixed

References

External links

Marika Trettin - Leiterin Finanzbuchhaltung - Credopard GmbH | XING

Team Jentsch official site (web archive)

Video: 

Living people
1983 births
People from Altenberg, Saxony
Sportspeople from Saxony
German female curlers